Derek Antony Parfit  (11 December 1942 – 1  or 2 January 2017) was a British philosopher who specialised in personal identity, rationality, and ethics. He is widely considered one of the most important and influential moral philosophers of the late 20th and early 21st centuries.

Parfit rose to prominence in 1971 with the publication of his first paper, "Personal Identity". His first book, Reasons and Persons (1984), has been described as the most significant work of moral philosophy since the 1800s. His second book, On What Matters (2011), was widely circulated and discussed for many years before its publication.

For his entire academic career, Parfit worked at Oxford University, where he was an Emeritus Senior Research Fellow at All Souls College at the time of his death. He was also a visiting professor of philosophy at Harvard University, New York University, and Rutgers University. He was awarded the 2014 Rolf Schock Prize "for his groundbreaking contributions concerning personal identity, regard for future generations, and analysis of the structure of moral theories."

Early life and education
Parfit was born in 1942 in Chengdu, China, the son of Jessie (née Browne) and Norman Parfit, medical doctors who had moved to Western China to teach preventive medicine in missionary hospitals. The family returned to the United Kingdom about a year after Parfit was born, settling in Oxford. Parfit was educated at Eton College, where he was nearly always at the top of the regular rankings in every subject except maths. From an early age, he endeavoured to become a poet, but he gave up poetry towards the end of his adolescence.

He then studied Modern History at Balliol College, Oxford, graduating in 1964. In 1965–66 he was a Harkness Fellow at Columbia University and Harvard University. He abandoned historical studies for philosophy during the fellowship.

Career
Parfit returned to Oxford to become a fellow of All Souls College, where he remained until he was 67, when the university’s mandatory retirement policy required him to leave both the college and the faculty of philosophy. He retained his appointments as regular Visiting Professor at Harvard, NYU, and Rutgers until his death.

Ethics and rationality

Reasons and Persons 

In Reasons and Persons, Parfit suggested that nonreligious ethics is a young and fertile field of inquiry. He asked questions about which actions are right or wrong and shied away from meta-ethics, which focuses more on logic and language.

In Part I of Reasons and Persons Parfit discussed self-defeating moral theories, namely the self-interest theory of rationality ("S") and two ethical frameworks: common-sense morality and consequentialism. He posited that self-interest has been dominant in Western culture for over two millennia, often making bedfellows with religious doctrine, which united self-interest and morality. Because self-interest demands that we always make self-interest our supreme rational concern and instructs us to ensure that our whole life goes as well as possible, self-interest makes temporally neutral requirements. Thus it would be irrational to act in ways that we know we would prefer later to undo.

As an example, it would be irrational for fourteen-year-olds to listen to loud music or get arrested for vandalism if they knew such actions would detract significantly from their future well-being and goals (such as having good hearing or an academic career in philosophy).

Most notably, the self-interest theory holds that it is irrational to commit any acts of self-denial or to act on desires that negatively affect our well-being. One may consider an aspiring author whose strongest desire is to write a masterpiece but who, in doing so, suffers depression and lack of sleep. Parfit argues that it is plausible that we have such desires which conflict with our own well-being, and that it is not necessarily irrational to act to fulfill these desires.

Aside from the initial appeal to plausibility of desires that do not directly contribute to one's life going well, Parfit contrived situations where self-interest is indirectly self-defeating—that is, it makes demands that it initially posits as irrational. It does not fail on its own terms, but it does recommend adoption of an alternative framework of rationality. For instance, it might be in my self-interest to become trustworthy to participate in mutually beneficial agreements, even though in maintaining the agreement I will be doing what will, other things being equal, be worse for me. In many cases self-interest instructs us precisely not to follow self-interest, thus fitting the definition of an indirectly self-defeating theory.

Parfit contended that to be indirectly individually self-defeating and directly collectively self-defeating is not fatally damaging for S. To further bury self-interest, he exploited its partial relativity, juxtaposing temporally neutral demands against agent-centred demands. The appeal to full relativity raises the question whether a theory can be consistently neutral in one sphere of actualisation but entirely partial in another. Stripped of its commonly accepted shrouds of plausibility that can be shown to be inconsistent, self-interest can be judged on its own merits. While Parfit did not offer an argument to dismiss S outright, his exposition lays self-interest bare and allows its own failings to show through. It is defensible, but the defender must bite so many bullets that they might lose their credibility in the process. Thus a new theory of rationality is necessary. Parfit offered the "critical present aim theory", a broad catch-all that can be formulated to accommodate any competing theory. He constructed critical present aim to exclude self-interest as our overriding rational concern and to allow the time of action to become critically important. But he left open whether it should include "to avoid acting wrongly" as our highest concern. Such an inclusion would pave the way for ethics. Henry Sidgwick longed for the fusion of ethics and rationality, and while Parfit admitted that many would avoid acting irrationally more ardently than acting immorally, he could not construct an argument that adequately united the two.

Where self-interest puts too much emphasis on the separateness of persons, consequentialism fails to recognise the importance of bonds and emotional responses that come from allowing some people privileged positions in one's life. If we were all pure do-gooders, perhaps following Sidgwick, that would not constitute the outcome that would maximise happiness. It would be better if a small percentage of the population were pure do-gooders, but others acted out of love, etc. Thus consequentialism too makes demands of agents that it initially deemed immoral; it fails not on its own terms, for it still demands the outcome that maximises total happiness, but does demand that each agent not always act as an impartial happiness promoter. Consequentialism thus needs to be revised as well.

Self-interest and consequentialism fail indirectly, while common-sense morality is directly collectively self-defeating. (So is self-interest, but self-interest is an individual theory.) Parfit showed, using interesting examples and borrowing from Nashian games, that it would often be better for us all if we did not put the welfare of our loved ones before all else. For example, we should care not only about our kids, but everyone's kids.

On What Matters 

In his second book, Parfit argues for moral realism, insisting that moral questions have true and false answers. Further, he suggests that the three most prominent categories of views in moral philosophy—Kantian deontology, consequentalism, and contractarianism (or contractualism)—converge on the same answers to moral questions.

In the book he argues that the affluent have strong moral obligations to the poor:

"One thing that greatly matters is the failure of we rich people to prevent, as we so easily could, much of the suffering and many of the early deaths of the poorest people in the world. The money that we spend on an evening’s entertainment might instead save some poor person from death, blindness, or chronic and severe pain. If we believe that, in our treatment of these poorest people, we are not acting wrongly, we are like those who believed that they were justified in having slaves. Some of us ask how much of our wealth we rich people ought to give to these poorest people. But that question wrongly assumes that our wealth is ours to give. This wealth is legally ours. But these poorest people have much stronger moral claims to some of this wealth. We ought to transfer to these people [...] at least ten per cent of what we earn."

Criticism

In his book On Human Nature, Roger Scruton criticised Parfit's use of moral dilemmas such as the trolley problem and lifeboat ethics to support his ethical views, writing, "These 'dilemmas' have the useful character of eliminating from the situation just about every morally relevant relationship and reducing the problem to one of arithmetic alone." Scruton believes that many of them are deceptive; for example, he does not believe one must be a consequentialist to believe that it is morally required to pull the switch in the trolley problem, as Parfit assumes. He instead suggests that more complex dilemmas, such as Anna Karenina's choice to leave her husband and child for Vronsky, are needed to fully express the differences between opposing ethical theories, and suggests that deontology is free of the problems that (in Scruton's view) beset Parfit's theory.

Personal identity
Parfit was singular in his meticulously rigorous and almost mathematical investigations into personal identity. In some cases, he used examples seemingly inspired by Star Trek and other science fiction, such as the teletransporter, to explore our intuitions about our identity. He was a reductionist, believing that since there is no adequate criterion of personal identity, people do not exist apart from their components. Parfit argued that reality can be fully described impersonally: there need not be a determinate answer to the question "Will I continue to exist?" We could know all the facts about a person's continued existence and not be able to say whether the person has survived. He concluded that we are mistaken in assuming that personal identity is what matters in survival; what matters is rather Relation R: psychological connectedness (namely, of memory and character) and continuity (overlapping chains of strong connectedness).

On Parfit's account, individuals are nothing more than brains and bodies, but identity cannot be reduced to either. (Parfit concedes that his theories rarely conflict with rival Reductionist theories in everyday life, and that the two are only brought to blows by the introduction of extraordinary examples, but he defends the use of such examples on the grounds that they arouse strong intuitions in many of us.) Identity is not as determinate as we often suppose it is, but instead such determinacy arises mainly from the way we talk. People exist in the same way that nations or clubs exist.

Following David Hume, Parfit argued that no unique entity, such as a self, unifies a person's experiences and dispositions over time. Therefore personal identity is not "what matters" in survival.

A key Parfitian question is: given the choice between surviving without psychological continuity and connectedness (Relation R) and dying but preserving R through someone else's future existence, which would you choose? Parfit argues the latter is preferable.

Parfit described his loss of belief in a separate self as liberating:

Criticism of personal identity view
Fellow reductionist Mark Johnston of Princeton rejects Parfit's constitutive notion of identity with what he calls an "Argument from Above". Johnston maintains, "Even if the lower-level facts [that make up identity] do not in themselves matter, the higher-level fact may matter. If it does, the lower-level facts will have derived significance. They will matter, not in themselves, but because they constitute the higher level fact."

In this, Johnston moves to preserve the significance of personhood. Parfit's explanation is that it is not personhood itself that matters, but rather the facts in which personhood consists that provide it with significance. To illustrate this difference between himself and Johnston, Parfit used an illustration of a brain-damaged patient who becomes irreversibly unconscious. The patient is certainly still alive even though that fact is separate from the fact that his heart is still beating and other organs are still functioning. But the fact that the patient is alive is not an independent or separately obtaining fact. The patient's being alive, even though irreversibly unconscious, simply consists in the other facts. Parfit explains that from this so-called "Argument from Below" we can arbitrate the value of the heart and other organs still working without having to assign them derived significance, as Johnston's perspective would dictate.

The future
In part four of Reasons and Persons, Parfit discusses possible futures for the world. Parfit discusses possible futures and population growth in Chapter 17 of Reasons and Persons. He shows that both average and total utilitarianism result in unwelcome conclusions when applied to population.

In the section titled "Overpopulation," Parfit distinguishes between average utilitarianism and total utilitarianism. He formulates average utilitarianism in two ways. One is what Parfit calls the "Impersonal Average Principle", which he formulates as "If other things are equal, the best outcome is the one in which people's lives go, on average, best." The other is what he calls the "Hedonistic version"; he formulates this as "If other things are equal, the best outcome is the one in which there is the greatest average net sum of happiness, per life lived." Parfit then gives two formulations of the total utilitarianism view. The first formulation Parfit calls the "Hedonistic version of the Impersonal Total Principle": "If other things are equal, the best outcome is the one in which there would be the greatest quantity of happiness—the greatest net sum of happiness minus misery." He then describes the other formulation, the "non-Hedonistic Impersonal Total Principle": "If other things are equal, the best outcome is the one in which there would be the greatest quantity of whatever makes life worth living.

Applying total utilitarian standards (absolute total happiness) to possible population growth and welfare leads to what he calls the repugnant conclusion: "For any possible population of at least ten billion people, all with a very high quality of life, there must be some much larger imaginable population whose existence, if other things are equal, would be better, even though its members have lives that are barely worth living." Parfit illustrates this with a simple thought experiment: imagine a choice between two possible futures. In A, 10 billion people would live during the next generation, all with extremely happy lives, lives far happier than anyone's today. In B, there are 20 billion people all living lives that, while slightly less happy than those in A, are still very happy. Under total utility maximisation we should prefer B to A. Therefore, through a regressive process of population increases and happiness decreases (in each pair of cases the happiness decrease is outweighed by the population increase) we are forced to prefer Z, a world of hundreds of billions of people all living lives barely worth living, to A. Even if we do not hold that coming to exist can benefit someone, we still must at least admit that Z is no worse than A. There have been a number of responses to Parfit's utilitarian calculus and his conclusion regarding future lives, including challenges to what life in the A-world would be like and whether life in the Z-world would differ very much from a normal privileged life; that movement from the A-world to the Z-world can be blocked by discontinuity; that rather than accepting the utilitarian premise of maximizing happiness, emphasis should be placed on the converse, minimizing suffering; challenging Parfit's teleological framework by arguing that "better than" is a transitive relation and removing the transitive axiom of the all-things-considered-better-than relation; proposing a minimal threshold of liberties and primary social goods to be distributed; and taking a deontological approach that looks to values and their transmission through time.

Parfit makes a similar argument against average utilitarian standards. If all we care about is average happiness, we are forced to conclude that an extremely small population, say ten people, over the course of human history is the best outcome if we assume that these ten people (Adam and Eve et al.) had lives happier than we could ever imagine. Then consider the case of American immigration. Presumably alien welfare is less than American, but the would-be alien benefits tremendously from leaving his homeland. Assume also that Americans benefit from immigration (at least in small amounts) because they get cheap labour, etc. Under immigration both groups are better off, but if this increase is offset by increase in the population, then average welfare is lower. Thus although everyone is better off, this is not the preferred outcome. Parfit asserts that this is simply absurd.

Parfit then discusses the identity of future generations. In Chapter 16 of Reasons and Persons he posits that one's existence is intimately related to the time and conditions of one's conception. He calls this "The Time-Dependence Claim": "If any particular person had not been conceived when he was in fact conceived, it is in fact true that he would never have existed".

Study of weather patterns and other physical phenomena in the 20th century has shown that very minor changes in conditions at time T have drastic effects at all times after T. Compare this to the romantic involvement of future childbearing partners. Any actions taken today, at time T, will affect who exists after only a few generations. For instance, a significant change in global environmental policy would shift the conditions of the conception process so much that after 300 years none of the same people that would have been born are in fact born. Different couples meet each other and conceive at different times, and so different people come into existence. This is known as the 'non-identity problem'.

We could thus craft disastrous policies that would be worse for nobody, because none of the same people would exist under the different policies. If we consider the moral ramifications of potential policies in person-affecting terms, we will have no reason to prefer a sound policy over an unsound one provided that its effects are not felt for a few generations. This is the non-identity problem in its purest form: the identity of future generations is causally dependent, in a very sensitive way, on the actions of the present generations.

Personal life

Parfit met Janet Radcliffe Richards in 1982, and they then began a relationship that lasted until his death. They married in 2010. Richards believes Parfit had Asperger syndrome.

Parfit supported effective altruism. He was a member of Giving What We Can and pledged to donate at least 10% of his income to effective charities.

Parfit was an avid photographer who regularly traveled to Venice and St. Petersburg to photograph architecture.

Selected works
1964: Eton Microcosm. Edited by Anthony Cheetham and Derek Parfit. London: Sidgwick & Jackson.
1971:  "Personal Identity". Philosophical Review. vol. 80: 3–27. 
1979: "Is Common-Sense Morality Self-Defeating?". The Journal of Philosophy, vol. 76, pp. 533–545, October. 
1984: Reasons and Persons. Oxford: Clarendon Press. 
1992: "Against the social discount rate" (with Tyler Cowen), in Peter Laslett & James S. Fishkin (eds.) Justice between age groups and generations, New Haven: Yale University Press, pp. 144–161.
1997: "Reasons and Motivation". The Aristotelian Soc. Supp., vol. 77: 99–130. 
2003: 
2006: "Normativity", in Russ Shafer-Landau (ed.). Oxford Studies in Metaethics, vol. I. Oxford: Clarendon Press.
2011: On What Matters, vols. 1 and 2. Oxford University Press.
2017: On What Matters, vol. 3. Oxford University Press.

References

Further reading
 Jussi Suikkanen and John Cottingham (Editors), Essays on Derek Parfit's On What Matters (Oxford, Wiley-Blackwell, 2009).

External links

Profile, All Souls College, Oxford 
Derek Parfit: a bibliography. A complete bibliography of writings.
Parfit's Climbing the Mountain reading group on PEA Soup

1942 births
2017 deaths
20th-century English philosophers
21st-century English philosophers
Alumni of Balliol College, Oxford
Analytic philosophers
British ethicists
Columbia University alumni
Fellows of All Souls College, Oxford
Harkness Fellows
Harvard University staff
Moral realists
New York University faculty
People associated with effective altruism
People educated at Eton College
Philosophers of identity
Rolf Schock Prize laureates
Fellows of the British Academy